Omia  may refer to:

 Omia (moth), a genus of moth
 Omia District, Peru
 Online Mendelian Inheritance in Animals, an online database of animal phenotypes
 Omia, a minor Enochian angel